Audubon's warbler (Setophaga auduboni) is a small bird of the family Parulidae.

This passerine bird was long known to be closely related to its eastern counterpart, the myrtle warbler, and at various times the two forms have been classed as separate species or grouped as the yellow-rumped warbler, Setophaga coronata.  The two forms probably diverged when the eastern and western populations were separated in the last ice age.

In North America, the discovery of a hybrid zone between the two forms in western Canada led the American Ornithologists' Union in 1973 to recognize them as a single species.

Audubon's warbler has a westerly distribution.  It breeds in much of western Canada, the western United States, and into Mexico. It is migratory, wintering from the southern parts of the breeding range into western Central America.

The summer male Audubon's warbler has a slate blue back, and yellow crown, rump and flank patch. It has white tail patches, and the breast is streaked black. The female has a similar pattern, but the back is brown, as are the breast streaks.

This form is distinguished from the myrtle warbler by its lack of a whitish eyestripe, its yellow throat, and concolorous cheek patch.

The breeding habitat is a variety of coniferous and mixed woodland. Audubon's warblers nest in a tree, laying four or five eggs in a cup nest.

These birds are insectivorous, but will readily take berries in winter, when they form small flocks.

The Audubon's warbler is most commonly found in coniferous forests, but can also be found in deciduous forests during the spring and summer. In the fall and winter, however, they migrate to more open, shrubby areas. This change in location coincides with their eating habits.

The song is a simple trill. The call is a hard check.

Measurements (both genders): Length: 4.7-5.5 in (12-14 cm)
Weight: 0.4-0.5 oz (12-13 g)
Wingspan: 7.5-9.1 in (19-23 cm)

Taxonomy
This passerine bird was long known to be closely related to its counterparts Audubon's warbler and myrtle warbler, and at various times the three forms have been classed as either one, two or three species. At present, the American Ornithological Society and Clements considers the myrtle, Audubon's, and Goldman's warbler three subspecies of the yellow-rumped warbler (Setophaga coronata coronata and Setophaga coronata auduboni, and Setophaga coronata goldmani respectively) while the IOC World Bird List classifies the myrtle warbler, Audubon's, and Goldman's warbler as separate species (Setophaga coronata, Setophaga auduboni, and Setophaga goldmani).

Species and subspecies 
The Audubon's warbler was originally called the Yellow-Rumped Warbler along with the Myrtle warbler. However, in 1973 scientists began to differentiate between them. Regionally, these subspecies are differentiated with the Myrtle warbler belonging to the eastern United States and the Audubon's warbler being found in the west.  Intermediate forms of the species can also exist when their breeding ranges overlap like in the hybrid zone in the United States and western Canada. A study done in 2011 concluded that Audubon's warbler is itself the result of hybridization of the myrtle warbler and black-fronted warbler. The study found that Audubon's warbler and the myrtle warbler share mitochondrial DNA and migratory patterns and northern Audubon's warblers’ nuclear allele frequency and wing span were an average between the Myrtle Warbler and black-fronted warbler while southern Audubon's warblers allele frequency and wing span mimicked the black-fronted warbler.

Seasonal, age, and gender differences

Spring 
The Audubon's Warbler tends to be rather active, typically spotted while catching insects during the warmer months in the year.

The adult male has a dark back with a bright yellow throat and black head. The adult female's throat and shoulders contain less yellow than the males and is further distinguished by the brown in its back and its white wing bars compared to the white wing panels of the males.

The juvenile male is similarly colored but with more black in its tail and can be distinguished by its incomplete wing panel. The juvenile female is much browner than the adult female and has whitish shoulders and some yellow in the throat.

Fall 
During the colder months of the year the Audubon's Warbler is usually found eating berries and traveling in flocks.

The adult male has a grey and black back with black lores and black streaks in the breast. However, there is significant overlap with the adult female so the identification of the adult male can be conclusive only if there is extensive black across the back and breast. The adult female and juvenile male are virtually indistinguishable and have lighter breast streakings and are browner than the adult male.

The juvenile female is very dull and has a slightly-tinted yellow throat but there is considerable overlap between the juvenile female and adult female. The two can only be definitely distinguished in cases where the juvenile throat is white or the juvenile displays two feather ages in its greater converts.

Gallery

References 

 New World Warblers by Curson, Quinn and Beadle, 
Cornell University All About Birds guide to yellow-rumped warbler species distinctions

Audubon's warbler
Native birds of Western Canada
Native birds of the Western United States
Audubon's warbler
Audubon's warbler